In the United Kingdom, the internal divisions of England, Northern Ireland, Wales and Scotland each have a different system of local government. Please see below for the most appropriate article relating to mayors or their equivalent:

Directly elected mayors in England and Wales
Mayors in England
Mayors in Northern Ireland
Mayors in Wales
Provost (civil), the ceremonial head of many Scottish local authorities

See also

Local government in England
Local government in Scotland
Local government in Wales 
Local government in Northern Ireland

Local government in the United Kingdom